Veterans Memorial Park is a park located in Beaverton, Oregon, United States.  The Beaverton American Legion Post #124 hosts Memorial Day and Veterans Day ceremonies at the park annually.

References

External links

 

Military monuments and memorials in the United States
Monuments and memorials in Oregon
Parks in Beaverton, Oregon